HAT-P-23 is a G-type main-sequence star about 1200 light-years away. It has a rapid rotation (rotation period equal to 7 days) for its advanced age of 4 billion years, and exhibits a strong starspot activity. The star may be in the process of being spun up by the giant planet on close orbit. The star is enriched in heavy elements, having about 140% amount of metals compared to solar abundance.

Naming
In 2019, the HAT-P-23 star has received a proper name Moriah and planet HAT-P-23b - Jebus at an international NameExoWorlds contest. These names mean the ancient name of the mount at the center of Jerusalem city, and ancient (pre-Roman) name of Jerusalem itself, respectively.

Planetary system
In 2010 a transiting hot Jupiter like planet was detected. It has an measured nightside temperature of 2154 K. The planet is believed to be on an unstable orbit, and expected to be engulfed by its parent star about 7.5 million years from now, although timing measurements of multiple transits since the discovery have been unable to detect any reduction in the orbital period. The planetary orbit is probably aligned with the equatorial plane of the star, misalignment equal to 15°. The color of planetary atmosphere is grey. The atmosphere is mostly devoid of clouds, and shows tentatively a presence of Titanium(II) oxide.

References

Delphinus (constellation)
G-type main-sequence stars
Planetary systems with one confirmed planet
Planetary transit variables
J20242972+1645437